The Inter-American Convention on International Traffic in Minors is a treaty of the Organization of American States (OAS) that was adopted at Mexico City, Mexico, on March 19, 1994, at the Fifth Inter-American Specialized Conference On Private International Law.
 
In consideration of the importance of ensuring comprehensive and effective protection for minors, through appropriate mechanisms to guarantee respect for their rights, and awareness that the international traffic of minors is a universal concern in the light of conventions on the international protection of minors, particularly the provisions of Articles 11 and 35 of the Convention on the Rights of the Child, and convinced of the need to regulate civil and penal aspects of the international traffic in minors, the OAS reaffirmed the importance of international cooperation to achieve effective protection of the best interests of minors by agreeing upon the Inter-American Convention on the International Return of Children.

Convention aims

The Convention begins by broadly describing its intent in Article 1:

Accordingly, the States Parties to this Convention undertake to: 

a) ensure the protection of minors in consideration of their best interests; 

b) institute a system of mutual legal assistance among the States Parties, dedicated to the prevention and punishment of the international traffic in minors, as well as adopt related administrative and legal provisions to that effect; and 

c) ensure the prompt return of minors who are victims of international traffic to the State of their habitual residence, bearing in mind the best interests of the minors.|Article 1|Inter-American Convention on the International Return of Children

Members

Over half of the 35 Member States of the Organisation of American States are party to the Hague Convention on the Civil Aspects of International Child Abduction, and over a third of Member States are also party to the Inter-American Convention on the International Return of Children. When a State is party to both Conventions, Article 34 of the Inter-American Convention assigns priority to the Inter-American Convention over the Hague Abduction Convention unless otherwise agreed upon between the States individually.  To date there are no known instances of this Convention being used for parental child trafficking.

References

External links
Text of the treaty
Parties

Human trafficking treaties
Organization of American States treaties on Private International Law
International child abduction
Treaties concluded in 1994
Treaties entered into force in 1997
Treaties of Argentina
Treaties of Belize
Treaties of Bolivia
Treaties of Brazil
Treaties of Colombia
Treaties of Costa Rica
Treaties of the Dominican Republic
Treaties of Ecuador
Treaties of El Salvador
Treaties of Honduras
Treaties of Nicaragua
Treaties of Panama
Treaties of Paraguay
Treaties of Peru
Treaties of Uruguay
1994 in Mexico